Eddi Gutenkauf (born 6 February 1928) is a Luxembourgian fencer. He competed in the individual and team épée events at the 1960 Summer Olympics.

References

External links
 

1928 births
Living people
Luxembourgian male épée fencers
Olympic fencers of Luxembourg
Fencers at the 1960 Summer Olympics
People from Ettelbruck